Petr Mach (born 22 March 1985 in the Czech Republic) is a Czech retired footballer who is last known to have played for CS Gaz Metan Mediaș in Romania.

Career

Mach started his senior career with FK Pardubice. In 2008, he signed for FK Mladá Boleslav in the Czech First League, where he made eighteen league appearances and scored zero goals. After that, he played for Bohemians Prague, FK Varnsdorf, FK Viktoria Žižkov, FC Baník Ostrava, and CS Gaz Metan Mediaș before retiring.

References

External links 
 
 
 
 
 Petr Mach considers the Dynamo engagement a new chance

1985 births
Living people
Czech footballers
FK Pardubice players
FK Mladá Boleslav players
FK Bohemians Prague (Střížkov) players
FK Varnsdorf players
FK Viktoria Žižkov players
CS Gaz Metan Mediaș players
Liga I players
Expatriate footballers in Romania
People from Čáslav
Czech expatriate sportspeople in Romania
MFK Chrudim players
FK Baník Sokolov players
FC Baník Ostrava players
Czech First League players
Czech National Football League players
Association football defenders
Sportspeople from the Central Bohemian Region